The 2012–13 season was the 146th season in Chesterfield's history. Along with League Two, the club also participated in the FA Cup, Football League Cup and Football League Trophy. The season covered the period from 1 July 2012 to 30 June 2013.

Squad

As of 27 April 2013.

League table

Appearances and goals

Results

League Two

F.A. Cup

League Cup

Football League Trophy

Top scorers
Includes all competitive matches. 
{| class="wikitable sortable" style="font-size: 95%; text-align: center;"
|-
!width=15|
!width=15|
!width=15|
!width=150|Name
!width=80|League Two
!width=80|F.A. Cup
!width=80|League Cup
!width=80|Football League Trophy
!width=80|Total
|-
|1
|FW
|
|Marc Richards
|12
|0
|0
|0
|12
|-
|2
|FW
|
|Jack Lester
|9
|1
|1
|0
|11
|-
|3
|MF
|
|Jay O'Shea
|7
|0
|0
|0
|7
|-
|4
|FW
|
|Chris Atkinson
|5
|0
|0
|0
|5
|-
|=
|MF
|
|Tendayi Darikwa
|5
|0
|0
|0
|5
|-
|6
|FW
|
|Craig Westcarr
|2
|1
|0
|0
|3
|-
|=
|DF
|
|Liam Cooper
|2
|1
|0
|0
|3
|-
|=
|FW
|
|Armand Gnanduillet
|3
|0
|0
|0
|3
|-
|=
|MF
|
|Sam Togwell
|3
|0
|0
|0
|3
|-
|10
|DF
|
|Terrell Forbes
|1
|1
|0
|0
|2
|-
|=
|DF
|
|Sam Hird
|2
|0
|0
|0
|2
|-
|=
|MF
|
|Mark Randall
|1
|1
|0
|0
|2
|-
|=
|MF
|
|Danny Whitaker
|1
|0
|0
|1
|2
|-
|=
|DF
|
|Drew Talbot
|2
|0
|0
|0
|2
|-
|15
|FW
|
|Scott Boden
|0
|1
|0
|0
|1
|-
|=
|FW
|
|Jordan Bowery
|1
|0
|0
|0
|1
|-
|=
|MF
|
|Craig Clay
|0
|1
|0
|0
|1
|-
|=
|FW
|
|Brennan Dickenson
|1
|0
|0
|0
|1
|-
|=
|DF
|
|Conor Townsend
|1
|0
|0
|0
|1
|-
|colspan="3"|
|TOTALS
|58
|7
|1
|1
|67
|-

References 

2012-13
2012–13 Football League Two by team